Vik (also Romanized as Vīk; also known as Wik) is a village in Sonbolabad Rural District, Soltaniyeh District, Abhar County, Zanjan Province, Iran. At the 2006 census, its population was 559, in 126 families.

References 

Populated places in Abhar County